Marinos Ouzounidis (born 10 October 1968) is a Greek football manager and former professional player.

Playing career
Ouzounidis started his professional career playing for Greek club Skoda Xanthi as a defender from 1987 until 1992.

He then transferred to Panathinaikos where he developed excellent skills as a libero defender, becoming an essential member of the brilliant team that conquered 1995 and 1996 Greek league championships. During this last period, the "Green Shamrocks" reached the semi-finals of the UEFA Champions League.

Good performances eventually resulted in a two-year term transfer to Le Havre AC in France. Ouzounidis returned to the Greek league in 1999, where he played with Paniliakos until 2001.

Ouzounidis finally left for APOEL in Cyprus and after winning the championship and the Super Cup in 2002, he retired there after the 2002–03 season.

International career
Ouzounidis' international career comprises forty-nine games with the "Ethniki", and was even the team captain during Vassilis Daniil management, making a remarkable couple with Nikos Dabizas, before Traianos Dellas' appearance.

International stats

Scores and results list Greece's goal tally first, score column indicates score after each Ouzounidis goal.

Managerial career
When he finished his career as a football player, Ouzounidis managed the team of Kappadokes Alexandoupolis (Greek Fourth Division) as head coach.
Later, in the 2005–06 season, he served as an assistant manager in Xanthi. In May 2006 he became the manager at APOEL. His first season was a very good one finishing first and winning the Championship three games before the end of the season. His team also reached the semi-finals of the Cypriot Cup. He resigned from APOEL during the second season, after four draws and three defeats in the first 15 games.

He accepted an offer from AEL on 9 May 2008. In his first season at AEL he was very successful driving the team in to the playoffs and securing a spot in the next Europa League. His record in the first year seemed to confirm AEL chairman Piladakis' idea on using young Greek coaches to lead the team to success. Unfortunately his second year at AEL began badly as the team was knocked out in the first qualifying round of the Europa League and on 22 February 2010 the young coach was sacked because Larissa had found themselves just above the relegation zone. On 9 August, Ouzounidis signed a contract with Iraklis. On 31 January 2011, with the club being only three points above relegation he resigned from his position as manager. In May 2011, Ouzounidis returned to Skoda Xanthi, where he stayed until September 2012, resigning his post after suffering a 3−0 home loss vs. PAOK.

In the summer of 2013, Ouzounidis took over management of Superleague side Platanias, but left the club toward the end of 2013. In January 2014, he was appointed manager of fellow Cretan top tier club Ergotelis, replacing Giannis Petrakis in mid season. He led the club to a 7th-place finish, the best in club history, accumulating a record 44 points (tied with 6th place local rival OFI). He left the club after the end of the 2013−14 season.

In December 2014, Ouzounidis was appointed as manager of Panionios, with which he had a high rate of success over two domestic campaigns, having recorded 28 wins and 20 draws over 70 games he was in charge for. On 10 August 2016, his contract with the club was terminated unilaterally, mainly because of disloyalty issues raised by the board, due to Ouzounidis simultaneously being in talks with Olympiacos over a potential career move.

On 1 December 2016, Ouzounidis agreed upon a one-and-a-half-year contract with Panathinaikos to take over the vacant managerial role at the club, right after the departure of former manager Andrea Stramaccioni. His first game in charge was a 1–0 victory over PAOK at Apostolos Nikolaidis Stadium three days later. He was credited with being eager to manage the team despite the chairman Giannis Alafouzos halting the club's funding and imposing radical budget cuts as a means of reducing Panathinaikos' debt. On 7 May 2018, Ouzounidis announced that he would leave the club on expiration of his contract, expressing his openness to return to Panathinaikos in the future under different financial and administrative circumstances.

On 25 May 2018, Ouzounidis was appointed as manager of 2017–18 Greek Superleague champions AEK Athens, on a biennial contract, only hours after the departure of Manolo Jiménez from the club. After the first half of the 2018–19 Super League Greece season, AEK were performing very poorly in the league and expectations were very high after they won the league the season before. They also were the team with the worst performance stats in the 2018–19 UEFA Champions League group stage, being eliminated after losing all six group matches, scoring only two goals, conceding 13 goals, for and against record of -11 and winning 0 points in their group. Ouzounidis was sacked after a home 1–1 derby draw with title favorites PAOK in February 2019.

After over a year break from the game, in February 2020, he returned for a second-stint in the Cypriot First Division as manager of Apoel. Just like his first stint, he failed to help the team enter the group stages either of the champions league or the europa league, and combined with a poor form in the domestic league, he was subsequently dismissed as manager on 28 October 2020.

On 23 July 2021, Ouzounidis was fired as Universitatea Craiova head coach following a 0-1 loss against Albanian underdogs Laçi in the 2021–22 UEFA Europa Conference League second qualifying round.

On 27 February 2022, Ouzounidis was appointed as manager of Saudi Arabian club Al Faisaly.

On 21 January 2023, Ouzounidis was once again appointed as the manager of Al-Faisaly. He was sacked on 16 March 2023.

Managerial statistics

Honours

As a player

Skoda Xanthi
Beta Ethniki: 1988–89

Panathinaikos
Alpha Ethniki: 1994–95, 1995–96
Greek Cup: 1992–93, 1993–94, 1994–95
Greek Super Cup: 1993, 1994

APOEL Nicosia
Cypriot First Division: 2001–02
Cypriot Super Cup: 2002

As a manager
APOEL Nicosia
Cypriot First Division: 2006–07

Universitatea Craiova
Cupa României: 2020–21
Supercupa României: 2021

Individual
Super League Greece Manager of the Season: 2015–16

References

1968 births
Living people
Greek footballers
Footballers from Alexandroupolis
APOEL FC players
Greek football managers
Le Havre AC players
Apollon Pontou FC players
Panathinaikos F.C. players
Xanthi F.C. players
Paniliakos F.C. players
Super League Greece players
Super League Greece managers
Saudi Professional League managers
Saudi First Division League managers
Cypriot First Division players
Ligue 1 players
Greece international footballers
Athlitiki Enosi Larissa F.C. managers
Iraklis Thessaloniki F.C. managers
APOEL FC managers
Xanthi F.C. managers
Ergotelis F.C. managers
CS Universitatea Craiova managers
Al-Faisaly FC managers
Association football defenders
Mediterranean Games gold medalists for Greece
Mediterranean Games medalists in football
Competitors at the 1991 Mediterranean Games
Greek expatriate footballers
Greek expatriate football managers
Greek expatriate sportspeople in France
Expatriate footballers in France
Greek expatriate sportspeople in Cyprus
Expatriate footballers in Cyprus
Expatriate football managers in Cyprus
Expatriate football managers in Romania
Greek expatriate sportspeople in Romania
Greek expatriate sportspeople in Saudi Arabia
Expatriate football managers in Saudi Arabia